The 1st Tennessee Heavy Artillery Regiment (African Descent) was an artillery regiment that served in the Union Army during the American Civil War.

Service
The 1st Tennessee Heavy Artillery (African Descent) was organized at Memphis, Tennessee, and mustered in for three years under the command of Colonel Ignatz G. Kappner.  As was custom at the time, the regiment was designated the 1st Tennessee (Colored) Heavy Artillery.  The regiment was initially recruited as eight companies, but actually mustered with twelve.

The regiment was attached to 1st Brigade, 5th Division, District of Memphis, XVI Corps, Department of the Tennessee, to April 1864.

The 1st Tennessee Heavy Artillery (African Descent) ceased to exist on March 11, 1864, when its designation was changed to the 2nd United States Heavy Artillery Regiment (Colored).  The latter designation was changed again on April 26, 1864, to 3rd United States Colored Heavy Artillery Regiment.

Detailed service
During its brief existence, the regiment performed post and garrison duty at Memphis, and at Fort Pickering, Defenses of Memphis, June 1863 to April 1864.

Commanders
 Colonel Ignatz G. Kappner

See also

 List of Tennessee Civil War units
 Tennessee in the Civil War

References
 Dyer, Frederick H.  A Compendium of the War of the Rebellion (Des Moines, IA:  Dyer Pub. Co.), 1908.
Attribution

External links
 Brief unit history, including officers' names, regimental strengths, etc.

Military units and formations established in 1863
Military units and formations disestablished in 1864
Units and formations of the Union Army from Tennessee
1865 disestablishments in Tennessee
Tennessee Heavy Artillery, 001
Artillery units and formations of the American Civil War
1863 establishments in Tennessee